The Aga Khan's Maqbara or Aga Khan's Dargah is the mausoleum of Aga Khan I, located in Mazgaon, Mumbai, India.

The construction of the mausoleum began soon after Aga Khan I's funeral in 1881, and it was finally completed in 1884. The mausoleum is well kept and is looked after by the jamaatkhana of the Khoja Muslims. It seems to have been inspired by the Taj Mahal.

See also
 Mausoleum of Aga Khan

References 

Tombs in India
 
Aga Khans